Polythiazyl (polymeric sulfur nitride), is an electrically conductive, gold- or bronze-colored polymer with metallic luster. It was the first conductive inorganic polymer discovered and was also found to be a superconductor at very low temperatures (below 0.26 K). It is a fibrous solid, described as "lustrous golden on the faces and dark blue-black", depending on the orientation of the sample. It is air stable and insoluble in all solvents.

History
The compound was first reported as early as 1910 by F.P. Burt, who obtained it by heating tetrasulfur tetranitride in vacuum over silver wool.

The compound was the first non-metallic compound in which superconductivity could be demonstrated. However, the relatively low transition temperature at about 0.3 K makes a practical application unlikely.

Properties 
Polythiazyl is a metallic-golden and shiny, crystalline but fibrous material. The polymer is mostly inert to oxygen and water, but decomposes in air to a grey powder. At temperatures above 240 °C explosive decomposition can occur. The compound also explodes on impact.

Polythiazyl shows an anisotropic electrical conductivity. Along the fibres or SN chains, the bond is electrically conductive, perpendicular to it acts as an insulator. The one-dimensional conductivity is based on the bonding conditions in the S-N chain, where each sulfur atom provides two π electrons and each nitrogen atom provides one π electron to form two-center 3π electron bonding units.

Two polymorphic crystal forms were observed in the compound. The monoclinic form I obtained from the synthesis can be converted into an orthorhombic form II by mechanical treatment such as grinding.

Structure and bonding
The material is a polymer, containing trivalent nitrogen, and divalent and tetravalent sulfur. The S and N atoms on adjacent chains align. Several resonance structures can be written.

The structure of the crystalline compound was resolved by X-ray diffraction. This showed alternating S–N bond lengths of 159 pm and 163 pm and S–N–S bond angles of 120 ° and N–S–N bond angles of 106 °.

Synthesis

Polythiazyl is synthesized by the polymerization of the dimer disulfur dinitride, which is in turn synthesized from the cyclic alternating tetramer tetrasulfur tetranitride. Conversion from cyclic tetramer to dimer is catalysed with hot silver wool.

S4N4 (w/ Ag2S catalyst) → 2 S2N2 (w/ 77K cold finger) → S2N2
S2N2 (@ 0°C, sublimes to surface) → thermal polymerization → (SN)x

Uses
Due to its electrical conductivity, polythiazyl is used in LEDs, transistors, battery cathodes, and solar cells.

Literature 
King, R.S.P.: Novel chemistry and applications of polythiazyl, Doctoral Thesis Loughborough University 2009, pdf-Download

References

Inorganic polymers
Nitrides
Superconductors
Sulfur–nitrogen compounds
Conductive polymers